Marj Al-Hamam is the district number 27 of Metropolitan Amman – Greater Amman Municipality (GAM); it is situated to the western part of GAM. It comprises 16 neighborhoods and population gatherings (Circassians neighborhood, Alia Housing, Officers Housing,..); it is 53 Km2 of space; its population counts for 82788 capita. Its zoning borders include Naour, Mqabalein, and Wadi EsSeer. Since 2007, it has been part of the Greater Amman Municipality.

References 

Populated places in Amman Governorate
Districts of Amman